The Pima Air & Space Museum, located in Tucson, Arizona, is one of the world's largest non-government funded aerospace museums. The museum features a display of nearly 300 aircraft spread out over 80 acres (320,000 m²) on a campus occupying 127 acres (513,000 m²). It has also been the home to the Arizona Aviation Hall of Fame since 1991.

Overview
A large number of the museum's aircraft are displayed outside with the remainder located in one of the museum's four display hangars. In addition to the display hangars, the museum has a restoration hangar.

Opened to the public in May 1976 with 48 aircraft then on display, the Museum's main hangar houses an SR-71A Blackbird, an A-10 Warthog, a United States Air Force Through the Years exhibit, and a mock-up of a control tower.

The museum is adjacent to Davis-Monthan Air Force Base. The 309th Aerospace Maintenance and Regeneration Group (AMARG), affiliated with the base, also known as the "Graveyard of Planes" or "The Boneyard", is the largest aircraft storage and preservation facility in the world.

History
The museum opened to the public on May 8, 1976. In early 1982 the first hangar on the site was completed. A second was built in 1987, a third in 1992, and a fourth in 1994.

In 2012, the museum collaborated with artists, in The Boneyard Project, to place some abandoned aircraft on display as canvases for art.

During 2015, Boeing donated to the museum a flight test 787 aircraft which is the second ever built. It is exhibited in the colors of the 787 customer, ANA.

In November 2016, Orbis International donated their first McDonnell-Douglas DC-10 Flying Eye Hospital to the museum, after receiving a second DC-10 from FedEx.

The museum acquired  in January 2021 for the construction of the Tucson Military Vehicle Museum. The new museum will house a large number of mostly land vehicles, including 50 donated by the Imperial War Museum.

Selected aircraft on display

Out of a collection of 300 aircraft, these are the most prominent:

 Boeing 777
 Boeing B-17 Flying Fortress
 Boeing B-29 Superfortress
 Consolidated B-24 Liberator
 Convair B-36J Peacemaker
 English Electric Lightning
 Lockheed SR-71 Blackbird

 Martin PBM Mariner
 North American F-107
 Aero Spacelines Super Guppy 
 Boeing 747-100
 Boeing 787
 Douglas DC-10

 B-17G serial number 44-85828 is on display at the 390th Memorial Museum, co-located on the grounds of the Pima Air & Space Museum.

In addition to other ephemera, the museum contains the Shuttle Mission Simulator's GNS (Guidance and Navigation Simulator) trainer, and a full-size mockup of the Solid Rocket Booster.

See also
 List of aerospace museums
 Pinal Airpark

References

External links

 
 The Boneyard Project, Eric Firestone Gallery, Tucson. Includes narrated video/slide show.

Aerospace museums in Arizona
Culture of Tucson, Arizona
Buildings and structures in Tucson, Arizona
Museums in Tucson, Arizona
Landmarks in Tucson, Arizona
Military and war museums in Arizona
Aviation halls of fame
Museums established in 1976
1976 establishments in Arizona